João Nuno Pinto Lima (born 23 June 1996) is a Portuguese professional footballer who plays for Felgueiras 1932 as a defender.

Club career
Born in Matosinhos, Lima debuted professionally with Benfica B in a 2015–16 Segunda Liga match against Sporting Covilhã on 20 October 2015. On 1 July 2017, he signed a two-year contract with Leixões S.C., thus returning to his local youth club.

References

External links

National team data 

1996 births
Living people
Sportspeople from Matosinhos
Portuguese footballers
Association football defenders
S.L. Benfica B players
Liga Portugal 2 players
U.D. Leiria players
F.C. Felgueiras 1932 players
Portugal youth international footballers